In Russia, graffiti (or street art) is an ambiguous phenomenon, i.e. considered to be desecration by some, and art by others. It is done for a variety of reasons, including expressing oneself through an art form, or protesting against a corporation or ideology.

Festivals and gatherings

Although graffiti historically was never completely welcome in Russia, as graffiti artists were often part of Russia's underground movement, modern trends have made the practice more mainstream and accepted. Moscow's Dream Energy graffiti festival "encourages Russia’s graffiti artists to come out and let their creativity go wild, painting the gray walls of Moscow’s ubiquitous power stations". "Grammatika", a graffiti show that took place in Russia from March 12 to March 18, 2012, featured work from twelve Russian graffiti writers: Bioks, Page2, Camin, Ramze, Oxake, Yoker, Uran, Rocks, Kesit, Coast, Vika, and Gnutov. Founded by Berlin graffiti writer Akim, "Sign Your Style" is a graffiti festival, held in Moscow on May 7, and on May 13 in Saint Petersburg, Russia. In the preview video, Petro, a judge for the competition part of the festival, shows in how he expects writers participating to "simply go off and get creative", by freestyling some futurist outlines, doing a blind folded one-liner piece, and a throwing up some handstyle alphabets. The purpose of this Russian festival is to expand the originality and unique subtleties in Russian graffiti style. The festival was fully supported by the Russian spray paint company, Rush. The main festival for graffiti in Russia is Stenograffia in Yekaterinburg. You can also find a lot of works in St.Petersburg Street-art museum.

Protests
Since the collapse of the Berlin Wall, statues celebrating communist rule have been easy targets for graffiti artists living in the former Soviet block. An example of this is the Russian Red Army soldiers on a monument in Sofia, Bulgaria, which has been turned into popular superheroes and cartoon characters (including Superman, Santa Claus, Ronald McDonald, and the Joker) by an anonymous graffiti artist. The words "Moving with the times", written in Bulgarian, appear below the artwork. The monument that the artist graffitied was originally built in 1954 to commemorate the 10th anniversary of the Russian liberation of Bulgaria.

As a protest to the heightened security in St Petersberg due to the 2011 International Economic Forum, Voina (meaning "War") - a graffiti group - painted a huge phallus on the Liteiny Bridge. The general idea is that the penis erects as the bridge rises to allow traffic to pass through. The annual Innovation awards gave Voina the prize for best work of visual art. The work, entitled "A Penis In KGB Captivity" won Voina 400,000 rubles. However they had to spend time in jail due to their stunt. Banksy, a supporter of the groups antics, bailed them out. After failing to get Voina’s approval to include the picture, organisers removed it from their shortlist, and the painting itself was eventually washed off by firefighters.

There have been cases of anti-Muslim xenophobic graffiti in and around the city of Moscow. Slogans like "Russia is for Russians" cover the walls along the railroad to Moscow’s Domodedovo airport. In response to some of these incidents, officials questioned why people would be drawn to expressing nationalistic statements in a multinational and multi-confessional country. The mufti, Albir Krganov, who believes that this graffiti insults the feelings of believers and non-Russian nationals, said that "fences and walls belong to someone and [the owners] should watch what’s written on them". In a published document, the Human Rights Bureau referred to the graffiti as a "glaring problem", and explained that "nationalistic slogans and symbols are dangerous since they are insulting and, also, inspire people with fear for their safety as well as for the future of the country".

In 2012, a group of Moscow LGBT activists graffitied the United Russia party office by painting "a rainbow... the slogan 'We will not be prohibited', [and] the party label... all over". The group covered the Russian building in LGBT signs and symbols because Vsevolod Chaplin, its head, used homophobic slogans. The protest itself was against new piece of legislation prohibiting gay propaganda, something which was widely discussed in the leadup to the presidential elections in Russia.

In 2009, an anonymous graffiti artist painted the words "Your God is dead. Get out and go home!" with a stencil in the church’s building in Rostov-on-don in Russia. As one of the first Churches of Christ to be recognized by the Russian government (registered in 1992), it has been the centre of much controversy in the city.

Other cases

There is a Russian graffiti artist named Pavel 183 (also nicknamed "The Russian Banksy") whose murals have been compared to Banksy's work. Pavel 183's pieces in the Moscow area share similarities with Banksy's in that they appear on median dividers, walls, bridges, and mixed media installations. Pavel 183 died of unknown causes on April 1, 2013.

Vova Chernyshev and his friends created a series of tram graffiti pieces in Nizhny Novgorod in their local train yard.

References

External links

 Post-Soviet Graffiti
 Street-art in Russian Federation
 Examples of Russian street art at Flickr
 Examples of Russian street art at moscowgraffiti
 Gallery of russian graffiti photos
Street art and Graffiti artists in Russia /

 
Public art in Russia